Kiss me, I'm Irish is a common phrase associated with St. Patrick's Day. It often appears on T-shirts. It originates from the legend of the Blarney Stone, which is believed to bring luck and eloquence to those who kiss it.

References

Phrases
Saint Patrick's Day
Kissing